Małszewo  (1938-45 Malshöfen) is a village in the administrative district of Gmina Jedwabno, within Szczytno County, Warmian-Masurian Voivodeship, in northern Poland. 

References

Villages in Szczytno County